This is a list of awards and nominations received by Teen Top, a South Korean boy band formed in 2010 by TOP Media.

Mnet Asian Music Awards

Seoul Music Awards

Golden Disk Awards

Melon Music Awards

Other awards and honors

References

Teen Top
Awards